María Antonia Socas Ortiz Lanús (Buenos Aires, August 12, 1959) is an Argentine actress.

Although active in various media in her native country, particularly telenovelas and stage, she is foremost known to international viewers for a number of mid-1980s sword and sorcery films produced by Roger Corman and Héctor Olivera, most notably as one of the title characters in John C. Broderick's The Warrior and the Sorceress.

Partial filmography
 Las voces ("The Voices", 2011)
 Paco (2009)
 The Hands (2006)
 Kamchatka (2002)
 Deathstalker II (1987)
 Wizards of the Lost Kingdom (1985)
 The Warrior and the Sorceress (1984)
 Funny Dirty Little War (1983)

References

External links
 Official website
 

1959 births
Living people
Argentine film actresses
Argentine stage actresses
Argentine telenovela actresses
Actresses from Buenos Aires